Operation Hawk was a military operation conducted by the Turkish Armed Forces against Kurdistan Workers' Party (PKK) positions in Diyarbakır and Bingöl in April 1996.

The operation started on the night of 5 April 1996 in mountainous areas between Lice, Hani, Kulp and Genç. As a result, 241 PKK militias and 40 Turkish troops died and 6 PKK militas were captured alive. Troops from 7th Corps in Diyarbakır and 8th Corps in Elazığ, Turkish Air Force and units from Gendarmerie General Command and Police Special Operation Department were involved in the operation.

References 

1996 in Turkey
Hawk
History of the Kurdistan Workers' Party
Kurdish–Turkish conflict (1978–present)
Hawk